The House Judiciary Subcommittee on Courts, Intellectual Property and the Internet is a subcommittee within the House Judiciary Committee. It was established in 2011.

Jurisdiction 
Administration of the U.S. Courts, the Federal Rules of Evidence, Civil and Appellate Procedure, judicial ethics, copyright, patent, trademark law and information technology.

Members, 118th Congress
To be confirmed.

Historical membership rosters

115th Congress

116th Congress

See also 
 United States House Committee on the Judiciary

References

External links 
 Subcommittee page

Judiciary Courts, Intellectual Property and the Internet